This List of Gates in Korea consists of all gates, past and present, found in North and South Korea. It is arranged alphabetically by official name (if known), and is incomplete.

Gates in North and South Korea

See also 
 List of fortresses in Korea
 Korean architecture

References 

Korea
Gates in Korea
Gates in North Korea
Gates in South Korea